Uncas was a 17th-century Mohegan sachem.

Uncas may also refer to:

 Uncas, a character in the novel The Last of the Mohicans
 Uncas (boat), the first steamship to pass through the Portland Canal
 USS Uncas, numerous ships of the U.S. Navy

See also 
 UNCA (disambiguation)